In the geological timescale, the Berriasian is an age/stage of the Early/Lower Cretaceous. It is the oldest subdivision in the entire Cretaceous. It has been taken to span the time between 145.0 ± 4.0 Ma and 139.8 ± 3.0 Ma (million years ago). The Berriasian succeeds the Tithonian (part of the Jurassic) and precedes the Valanginian.

Stratigraphic definition
The Berriasian Stage was introduced in scientific literature by Henri Coquand in 1869.  It is named after the village of Berrias in the Ardèche department of France. The largely non-marine English Purbeck Formation is in part of Berriasian age. The first rocks to be described of this age were the beds of the English Purbeck Formation, named as the Purbeckian by Alexandre Brongniart in 1829 following description by Henry De la Beche, William Buckland, Thomas Webster and William Henry Fitton.

The base of the Berriasian, which is also the base of the Cretaceous System, has traditionally been placed at the first appearance of fossils of the ammonite species Berriasella jacobi.   But this is a species that has a stratigraphically problematic and geographically limited distribution.   A global reference profile (a GSSP) for the Berriasian has been under active consideration by the Berriasian Working Group (ISCS) of IUGS since 2010.  A range of contender GSSP localities has been studied in detail by the Working Group including localities as far apart as Mexico, Ukraine, Tunisia, Iraq and the Russian Far East.   Several markers have been employed to refine correlations and to work towards defining a base for the Berriasian Stage.  These include calcareous microfossils, such as Nannoconus, calpionellids, ammonites, palynological data and magnetostratigraphy, notably magnetozone M19n.  The calibration of these markers, especially Nannoconus steinmannii minor, N. kamptneri minor, and Calpionella alpina,  within precisely fixed magnetozones give greater precision in trying to identify the best position for a boundary.  In 2016, the Berriasian Working Group voted to adopt Calpionella alpina as the primary marker for the base of the Berriasian Stage.  In 2019, a GSSP for the Berriasian was nominated by a vote of the Berriasian Working Group of the Cretaceous Subcommission (ISCS): it is the profile of Tré Maroua in the Vocontian Basin (Hautes Alpes, France). The GSSP was defined at the base of the Alpina Subzone in the middle of magnetozone M19n.2n. This site proposal, of Tré Maroua, was subsequently unsuccessful in a vote of the ISCS (8 votes for and 8 against: 4 not voting); a new working group was formed in 2021. 

In the western part of the ocean of Tethys, the Berriasian consists of four ammonite biozones, from top to bottom (latest to earliest):
 Thurmanniceras otopeta
 Subthurmannia boissieri
 Tirnovella occitanica
 Berriasella jacobi/Pseudosubplanites grandis

The top of the Berriasian stage is defined by the base of the Valanginian, which is fixed at the first appearance of calpionellid species Calpionellites darderi. This is just a little below the first appearance of the ammonite species Thurmanniceras pertransiens.

Regional terms used in Russia include "Volgian"(which spans perhaps the latest Kimmeridgian, all the Tithonian and an uncertain amount of the lower Berriasian) and the "Ryazanian" (?upper Berriasian) .

References

Notes

Literature
; (2004): A Geologic Time Scale 2004, Cambridge University Press.

External links
GeoWhen Database - Berriasian
Jurassic-Cretaceous timescale, at the website of the subcommission for stratigraphic information of the ICS
Stratigraphic chart of the Lower Cretaceous, at the website of Norges Network of offshore records of geology and stratigraphy

 
01
Geological ages
Cretaceous geochronology